In mathematics, hyperbolic functions are analogues of the ordinary trigonometric functions, but defined using the hyperbola rather than the circle. Just as the points  form a circle with a unit radius, the points  form the right half of the unit hyperbola.

Hyperbolic functions occur in the calculations of angles and distances in hyperbolic geometry. They also occur in the solutions of many linear differential equations (such as the equation defining a catenary), cubic equations, and Laplace's equation in Cartesian coordinates. Laplace's equations are important in many areas of physics, including electromagnetic theory, heat transfer, fluid dynamics, and special relativity.

The basic hyperbolic functions are:
 hyperbolic sine "",
 hyperbolic cosine "",
from which are derived:
 hyperbolic tangent "",
 hyperbolic cosecant "" or ""
 hyperbolic secant "",
 hyperbolic cotangent "",
corresponding to the derived trigonometric functions.

The inverse hyperbolic functions are:
 area hyperbolic sine "" (also denoted "", "" or sometimes "")
 area hyperbolic cosine "" (also denoted "", "" or sometimes "")
 and so on.

The hyperbolic functions take a real argument called a hyperbolic angle. The size of a hyperbolic angle is twice the area of its hyperbolic sector. The hyperbolic functions may be defined in terms of the legs of a right triangle covering this sector.

In complex analysis, the hyperbolic functions arise when applying the ordinary sine and cosine functions to an imaginary angle. The hyperbolic sine and the hyperbolic cosine are entire functions. As a result, the other hyperbolic functions are meromorphic in the whole complex plane.

By Lindemann–Weierstrass theorem, the hyperbolic functions have a transcendental value for every non-zero algebraic value of the argument.

Hyperbolic functions were introduced in the 1760s independently by Vincenzo Riccati and Johann Heinrich Lambert. Lambert adopted the names, but altered the abbreviations to those used today.

Notation

Definitions

There are various equivalent ways to define the hyperbolic functions.

Exponential definitions 

In terms of the exponential function:

 Hyperbolic sine: the odd part of the exponential function, that is, 
 Hyperbolic cosine: the even part of the exponential function, that is, 
 Hyperbolic tangent: 
 Hyperbolic secant: 

Differential equation definitions 

The hyperbolic functions may be defined as solutions of differential equations: The hyperbolic sine and cosine are the solution  of the system

with the initial conditions  The initial conditions make the solution unique; without them any pair of functions  would be a solution.

Complex trigonometric definitions 

Hyperbolic functions may also be deduced from trigonometric functions with complex arguments:

 Hyperbolic sine: 
 Hyperbolic cosine: 
 Hyperbolic tangent: 
 Hyperbolic cotangent: 
 Hyperbolic secant: 
 Hyperbolic cosecant:

Characterizing properties

Hyperbolic cosine 

It can be shown that the area under the curve of the hyperbolic cosine (over a finite interval) is always equal to the arc length corresponding to that interval:

Hyperbolic tangent

Useful relations
The hyperbolic functions satisfy many identities, all of them similar in form to the trigonometric identities.

Odd and even functions:

Hence:

Hyperbolic sine and cosine satisfy:

the last of which is similar to the Pythagorean trigonometric identity.

One also has

for the other functions.

Sums of arguments

particularly

Also:

Subtraction formulas

Also:

Half argument formulas

where  is the sign function.

If , then

Square formulas

Inequalities

The following inequality is useful in statistics:
 

It can be proved by comparing term by term the Taylor series of the two functions.

Inverse functions as logarithms

Derivatives

Second derivatives

Standard integrals

The following integrals can be proved using hyperbolic substitution:

where C is the constant of integration.

Taylor series expressions
It is possible to express explicitly the Taylor series at zero (or the Laurent series, if the function is not defined at zero) of the above functions.

Since the function  is odd, only odd exponents for  occur in its Taylor series.

Since the function  is even, only even exponents for  occur in its Taylor series.

The sum of the sinh and cosh series is the infinite series expression of the exponential function.

The following series are followed by a description of a subset of their domain of convergence, where the series is convergent and its sum equals the function.

where:
 is the nth Bernoulli number
 is the nth Euler number

Infinite products and continued fractions
The following expansions are valid in the whole complex plane:

Comparison with circular functions

The hyperbolic functions represent an expansion of trigonometry beyond the circular functions. Both types depend on an argument, either circular angle or hyperbolic angle.

In the diagram, such a circle is tangent to the hyperbola xy = 1 at (1,1). The yellow sector depicts an area and angle magnitude. Similarly, the yellow and red sectors together depict an area and hyperbolic angle magnitude.

The legs of the two right triangles with hypotenuse on the ray defining the angles are of length  times the circular and hyperbolic functions.

The hyperbolic angle is an invariant measure with respect to the squeeze mapping, just as the circular angle is invariant under rotation.

The Gudermannian function gives a direct relationship between the circular functions and the hyperbolic functions that does not involve complex numbers.

The graph of the function  is the catenary, the curve formed by a uniform flexible chain, hanging freely between two fixed points under uniform gravity.

Relationship to the exponential function

The decomposition of the exponential function in its even and odd parts gives the identities

and

Combined with Euler's formula

this gives

for the general complex exponential function.

Additionally,

Hyperbolic functions for complex numbers
Since the exponential function can be defined for any complex argument, we can also extend the definitions of the hyperbolic functions to complex arguments.

Relationships to ordinary trigonometric functions are given by Euler's formula for complex numbers:

so:

Thus, hyperbolic functions are periodic with respect to the imaginary component, with period  ( for hyperbolic tangent and cotangent).

See also

 e (mathematical constant)
 Equal incircles theorem, based on sinh
 Hyperbolic growth
 Inverse hyperbolic functions
 List of integrals of hyperbolic functions
 Poinsot's spirals
 Sigmoid function
 Soboleva modified hyperbolic tangent
 Trigonometric functions

References

External links

Hyperbolic functions on PlanetMath
GonioLab: Visualization of the unit circle, trigonometric and hyperbolic functions (Java Web Start)
Web-based calculator of hyperbolic functions

 
Exponentials
Hyperbolic geometry
Analytic functions